John George Bucha (January 22, 1925 – April 28, 1996) was an American professional baseball player whose 18-year career included 84 games in Major League Baseball (MLB) over three seasons. A catcher and native of Allentown, Pennsylvania, Bucha appeared in only two games for the  St. Louis Cardinals, but was a full-year member of the  Redbirds (getting into 22 games) and the  Detroit Tigers (appearing in 60 contests).

Bucha's playing career lasted from 1943 through 1960. He joined the Cardinals' organization as an 18-year-old, playing for his hometown Allentown Wings of the Class B Interstate League. His minor league career would see him play in over 1,400 games, including over 1,000 games in Triple-A. At the MLB level, Bucha collected 40 hits, including ten doubles and one home run, in 195 career at bats. His home run came on September 9, 1953, against pitcher Harry Byrd at Connie Mack Stadium, as Bucha's Tigers defeated the Philadelphia Athletics, 8–2.

Bucha began 1954 with the Tigers' Triple-A affiliate, the Buffalo Bisons, but on June 9 he was traded to the Brooklyn Dodgers, along with Chuck Kress and Ernie Nevel, in exchange for Wayne Belardi. Bucha remained at the Triple-A level for the rest of his baseball career.

References

External links

1925 births
1996 deaths
Allentown Cardinals players
Allentown Wings players
Baseball players from Pennsylvania
Buffalo Bisons (minor league) players
Columbus Red Birds players
Detroit Tigers players
Houston Buffaloes players
Major League Baseball catchers
Miami Marlins (IL) players
Montreal Royals players
Omaha Cardinals players
Rochester Red Wings players
St. Louis Cardinals players
St. Paul Saints (AA) players
San Diego Padres (minor league) players
Sportspeople from Allentown, Pennsylvania